Elections to Liverpool City Council were held on 1 November 1931.

Nine of the forty seats were uncontested.

After the election, the composition of the council was:

Election result

Ward results

* - Councillor seeking re-election

Comparisons are made with the 1930 election results.

Abercromby

Aigburth

Allerton

Anfield

Breckfield

Brunswick

Castle Street

Childwall

Croxteth

Dingle

Edge Hill

Everton

Exchange

Fairfield

Fazakerley

Garston

Granby

Great George

Kensington

Kirkdale

Little Woolton

Low Hill

Much Woolton

Netherfield

North Scotland

Old Swan

Prince's Park

Sandhills

St. Anne's

St. Domingo

St. Peter's

Sefton Park East

Sefton Park West

South Scotland

Vauxhall

Walton

Warbreck

Wavertree

Wavertree West

West Derby

Aldermanic elections

Aldermanic election 9 November 1931

The term of office of Alderman Patrick Jeremiah Kelly (Independent (politician), expired on 9 November 1931), he was re-elected as an Alderman by the Councillors on the same date

Aldermanic election 1 June 1932

Caused by the death on 18 March 1932 of Alderman Charles Wilson (Labour, elected as an alderman on 9 November 1929). In his place Councillor Joseph Belger (Independent, last elected 1 November 1930) was elected by the councillors as an alderman on 1 June 1932

Aldermanic election 6 July 1932

Caused by the death on 13 May 1932 of Alderman Herbart John Davis (Conservative, elected as an alderman on 6 March 1929).  In his place Mr. Richard Rutherford (Conservative, whose resignation as an alderman was reported to the Council on 7 October 1931) was elected by the councillors as an alderman on 6 July 1932

The term of office to expire on 9 November 1935.

By-elections

No. 4 Vauxhall, 3 November 1931

Caused by the resignation of Councillor Dr. Percy Henry Hayes (Labour, Vauxhall, last elected on 1 November 1929), which was reported to the Council on 21 October 1931.

No. 34 Wavertree, 9 December 1931

Caused by the death of Councillor Albert Edward Martin (Conservative, elected to the Wavertree ward on 1 November 1929).

No. 4 Vauxhall, Tuesday 28 June 1932

Caused by the death on 18 March 1932 of Alderman Charles Wilson (Labour, elected as an alderman on 9 November 1929). In his place Councillor James Belger (Independent, last elected 1 November 1930) was elected by the councillors as an alderman on 1 June 1932

No. 13 Prince's Park, 27 September 1932

Caused by the death on 25 August 1932 of Councillor Alfred Wood (Conservative, last elected 1 November 1929)

See also

 Liverpool City Council
 Liverpool Town Council elections 1835 - 1879
 Liverpool City Council elections 1880–present
 Mayors and Lord Mayors of Liverpool 1207 to present
 History of local government in England

References

1931
1931 English local elections
November 1931 events
1930s in Liverpool